Best Kept Secret is a 2010 single release by Norwegian recording artist Didrik Solli-Tangen, released as the second single from his first studio album Guilty Pleasures (2010). The song features the Norwegian trumpet soloist Tine Thing Helseth.

Track listing 
Digital download
 "Best Kept Secret" (feat. Tine Thing Helseth)" - 3:26'

External links 
Best Kept Secret - lyrics
Didrik Solli-Tangen - Didrik Solli-Tangen official site

References 

2010 singles
Universal Music Group singles
English-language Norwegian songs
2010 songs